The 1991 New Mexico Lobos football team was an American football team that represented the University of New Mexico in the Western Athletic Conference (WAC) during the 1991 NCAA Division I-A football season.  In their fifth and final season under head coach Mike Sheppard, the Lobos compiled a 3–9 record (2–6 against WAC opponents) and were outscored by a total of 473 to 240. 

The team's statistical leaders included Stoney Case with 1,564 passing yards, Marc Wilson with 245 rushing yards, Carl Winston with 1,177 receiving yards, and kicker David Margolis with 50 points scored.

Schedule

References

New Mexico
New Mexico Lobos football seasons
New Mexico Lobos football